Giovanni Ricciardi may refer to:

 Giovanni Ricciardi (cellist) (born 1968), Italian cellist
 Giovanni Ricciardi (painter) (born 1977), Italian painter